Grischuk, Grishchuk or Grishuk is a gender-neutral Ukrainian surname. Notable people with the surname include:

 Alexander Grischuk (born 1983), Russian chess player
 Oksana Grishuk (born 1971), Russian ice dancer

Ukrainian-language surnames